Peace Mala (The Peace Mala Project for Global Citizenship and World Peace), is a British Registered Charity based in Morriston in Swansea, Wales dedicated to fostering inter-cultural, inter-faith tolerance, and promoting international humans rights and dignity. According to Peace Mala’s memorandum, the project aims to:
To advance the education of the public in global citizenship through the promotion of understanding, respect, friendship, tolerance and peace between all communities, cultures and different faiths and,
To promote human rights as set out in the Universal Declaration of Human Rights and subsequent United Nations conventions and declarations. 

Peace Mala is an educational project which provides resources to schools and community groups. The symbolic double rainbow Peace Mala bracelet is one such resource, either provided pre-made, or through kits encouraging to schools and groups to create their own whilst contemplating the various world faiths and lessons represented by each bead.

Peace Mala focuses on the Golden Rule: "Treat others as you would wish them to treat you". Its intention is to educate and remind everyone that this rule is recognised by many scholars, teachers and philosophers.

History
Peace Mala was founded in 2002 by Pam Evans MBE, former Head of the Department of Religious Studies at Coedcae Comprehensive School in Llanelli, Carmarthenshire, Wales. The idea arose from class discussions about the contribution of the "9/11" attacks in New York to Islamophobia, racism, religious intolerance and fundamentalism worldwide, as well as local effects exemplified by the experience of the student Imran Sheikh: "I suffered from racist taunts and our local mosque was attacked following September 11 and that is when the Peace Mala all started." In 2005 Evans gave up her position as Head of Department at Coedcae School to focus on her work with Peace Mala.  On 16 November 2006, (25th Shawwal 1427 AH), Evans was awarded the Noble Soul Award 2006 in recognition of her outstanding contribution to challenging Islamophobia in schools.  The award was presented by RAHMA (Racial Attacks and Harassment Monitoring Association) on the International Day of Peace.

Launch
Peace Mala was officially launched in the UNA Temple of Peace in Cardiff on Wednesday 27 November 2002 by Archbishop of Wales Rowan Williams (later Archbishop of Canterbury). He was joined by members of the fourteen faiths represented on the Peace Mala bracelet, whose procession opened the ceremony, along with NGOs, students and teachers of schools from across Wales, lecturers from the University of Wales, and pupils and staff of Coedcae Comprehensive School.

Awards
Through the promotion of peace, tolerance and respect, Peace Mala has received numerous awards for their work, notably The Prince's Trust Millennium Award in 2003, the Co-op Community Dividend Award in 2003, the ChildLine Cymru CHIPS Friendship and Respect Award in 2003 (1st Prize), and the Carmarthenshire Police Community Challenge Award in 2004.  In 2004 Peace Mala was also awarded First Prize in the CEWC-Cymru "Right-On" National Competition to promote Human Rights in Welsh schools. In 2006 Peace Mala was awarded a grant by Awards for All (Wales) in support of the Peace Mala Awards for Youth. In 2007, Peace Mala was awarded the Community Development Foundation Award. Peace Mala was awarded the Unboxed Award for excellence in positive activities for young people that maximize youth participation, empowerment and potential, and was presented by the City of London Parochial Foundation in 2008. The Corus Community Award from Tata Steel was awarded to Peace Mala in 2009 and 2010.

Charitable status
On 21 February 2007, Peace Mala, already a company limited by guarantee and not having a share capital, was entered in the Central Register of Charities as Registered Charity No. 1118053.

Patrons
Rowan Williams, Archbishop of Canterbury, was patron of Peace Mala from 2003 until 2008, and was succeeded by Lama Khemsar Rinpoche, Spiritual Director of the Yundrung Bön Study Centre.

Rowan Williams
Williams and Evans first met when he visited Coedcae School to give talks to the pupils about his work as Archbishop of Wales, a position now held by Barry Morgan.  Williams was one of the first persons to be contacted by Evans when she came up with the idea of the Peace Mala. One of Williams's final acts as Archbishop of Wales was to join 14 other religious dignitaries in the launch of the Peace Mala in November 2002.

In 2003 Evans invited Williams to be a patron; he held the position until 2008.

Lama Khemsar Rinpoche
Lama Khemsar Rinpoche also visited Coedcae School prior to his involvement with Peace Mala.  Rinpoche left Tibet in 1959, and is the first resident Lama of the Yungdrung Bön tradition in Europe. He also teaches widely in the US.

Evans invited Lama Khemsar Rinpoche to be a patron of the organisation, and he accepted.

The Peace Mala bracelet
A Peace Mala is a symbolic bracelet used to promote the message of the Golden Rule of mutual respect recognised by many spiritual paths. It consists of 16 beads, forming a double rainbow, which represent Christianity, Buddhism, Sikhism, Islam, Judaism, Baháʼí, ISKCON, Zoroastrianism, Tribal and Native Religions, Jainism, Earth religions, Taoism, Hinduism and Yungdrung Bön. The central iridescent clear crystal bead represents the wearer and whatever path they follow; it also represents the cosmos, emphasising the interconnectedness of everyone and everything. There are two knots on the elastic thread: one symbolising the wearer's uniqueness, inclusive of all races, colours, genders, sexualities, abilities, age, size, social class, or caste. The final knot is a reminder that how we behave in life affects everyone we meet and that we should follow a path of peace to help create a better world. The final crystal bead represents unity, harmony, and peace.

Website
The Peace Mala website was created in 2002 using money granted by the Princes Trust Millennium Award. It was designed and published using 100% solar power by the web publishing company Arcania. The website includes news articles relating to Peace Mala activities and endorsements from prominent religious leaders, political dignitaries and celebrities including the Pope John Paul II, the 14th Dalai Lama, Jillian Evans MEP, Sir Mark Tully Beth Nielsen Chapman, Bonnie Tyler and Barbara Dickson.

Registered office
On Wednesday 18 August 2004, the Peace Mala Registered Office was officially opened during a ceremony attended by the Lord Mayor and Consort of the City of Swansea.

The registered office is used as a base for Peace Mala activities including workshops and public talks.

Peace Garden
Attached to the registered office is a peace garden with many features including a shrine to Saint Francis of Assisi, Buddhist statues and prayer flags, a miniature Zen-style stone garden, water features, and a tree area which has been blessed in a ceremony led by Witches, and Druids.  There is also a tranquil area facing Mecca, which is dedicated to the Muslim faith.

Aims
Peace Mala outlined its "Main Aims" as:
Education for global citizenship through the promotion of understanding, respect, friendship, tolerance and peace between all communities, cultures and enlightened, compassionate faiths.
Peace Mala supports human rights, confronts bullying and all forms of prejudice.
Peace Mala raises awareness of issues of global interdependence and encourages active compassion by learners that will effect positive changes locally and globally.

International Awards for Youth
In 2006 Peace Mala launched the Peace Mala Awards for Youth.  The awards and competition encourage young people "...  to become aware of and involved with issues of peace, justice, tolerance and friendship.". The competition focuses in issues of equality, human rights and global citizenship.

The Youth Awards allows entrants from educational institutions, youth groups and faith groups. Two prizes are awarded: one for juniors (5–11) and the other for seniors (12–18). The awards were accompanied by cash prizes, and occasionally donated gifts such as commemorative framed posters signed by Gary Marlon Suson from the Ground Zero Museum Workshop.

In 2007 the Peace Mala Awards for Youth became an international competition with youth groups in the USA taking part in the project. In 2009 the Awards were superseded by the Peace Mala Accreditation.

Accreditation for Schools, Youth Groups and Community Groups
In September 2009 Peace Mala celebrated the last Youth Awards ceremony, where the Awards were replaced an accreditation for schools, youth groups and community groups.  As the Awards had focused on competitive engagement by schools and some youth groups, the accreditation would be more cooperative and inclusive.  Schools and groups are encouraged to include the vision and objectives of Peace Mala within their ethos via the seven criteria and accreditation is awarded when the seven criteria have been successfully fulfilled as outlined in the self-assessment form available to applicants. These seven areas are intended to fit into the school, youth group or community group's values system and are in line with the objectives and vision of Peace Mala.

Applicants for accreditation are judged against seven key criteria:

 Community cohesion and global citizenship
 Needs and human rights
 Interdependence
 Active compassion
 Celebrating diversity
 Environmental responsibilities and sustainable change
 Conflict resolution and peace education

Interfaith engagement
Along with education and youth engagement, with the religious nature of its founding, Peace Mala engages regularly with interfaith and diversity engagement and occasions. Awareness events and fundraisers are regular occurrences.

Pilgrimages
Pilgrimages have been used by Peace Mala as a means of promotion, but also as a means to engage communities in interfaith involvement and raise awareness of local areas of interest and community diversity.

Santiago de Compostela

Gower
In May 2011, volunteers discovered a route map which may have been a pilgrimage path linking the Celtic churches of the Gower Peninsula, as well pre-Christian sites such as holy wells and cromlech stones. A pilgrimage was organised, therefore, the next year to celebrate Peace Mala's first decennial year. The pilgrimage included one pilgrim who was joined at different legs of the pilgrimage culminating in a ceremony at St. Rhidian's Church in Llanrhidian. For the pilgrimage, Pam Evans travelled to Kildare to receive the flame of Brigid of the Brigidine Sisters of the Solas Bhríde hermitage; she then received the World Peace Flame at the Dru International Training Centre for Education and Wellbeing in Snowdonia National Park; finally, various faith representatives attended a ceremony where a flame was blessed at the shrine of St David at St David's Cathedral by The Very Revd Jonathan Lean. These three flames were used during the start of the pilgrimage, where the lights were blessed by The Rt Revd John Davies, Bishop of Swansea and Brecon; as well as at the end, where the flames were blessed by numerous faith representatives including Muslim, Druid and Buddhists, as well as ISKCON sannyasa who greeted the pilgrims with kirtan.

At each of the sites visited, the main pilgrim lit votive candles and recited a prayer composed for the pilgrimage. She was joined on various days by school children as well as fellow pilgrims.

Llangyfelach "Forgotten" Monastery
On Thursday 9 May 2013, Ascension Day, Peace Mala led a one-day pilgrimage as means of a revival of a postulated pilgrimage route to a now-defunct early Celtic monastery founded by St David on the site of the current parish Church of St David and St Cyfelach in Llangyfelach.

The participants in the pilgrimage included pupil from St John Lloyd Catholic School in Llanelli, Hafod Primary School in Swansea and Catwg Primary School. Also in procession were dignitaries from numerous faith, including The Rt Rev'd John Davies, Bishop of Swansea and Brecon, as well as representatives from the Brahma Kumaris World Spiritual University, the Catholic Church, Anglican Communion and Kagyu Tibetan Buddhism among many others.

Travelling Doves of Peace
Peace Mala released 14 small symbolic doves made from wood painted in the Peace Mala colours and each carrying a Peace Mala bracelet (along with other items) during a ceremony that took place in the Peace Mala peace garden on 30 April 2015. The Deputy Lord Mayor of the City and County of Swansea, the Mayor and Mayoress of Neath Port Talbot, Regional Chief of Police, Bishop Tom Burns of Menevia, representatives of several faith communities and pupils and teachers from some of Peace Mala Accredited schools were all in attendance.

The founder aims that as the Doves of Peace (also known as 'Peace Doves') travel the UK and across the world, they will raise awareness of the work of Peace Mala with schools, youth groups and community groups. Within the first few months after the launch, three of the doves travelled to the US, Ireland, Holland, Italy, Cyprus, Israel, Africa, Hong Kong and Japan. The journeys of the 14 doves are being tracked to provide a geography project for schools and youth groups. This information is published on Facebook, Twitter and our interactive world maps for people to follow online.

Each dove is being sponsored on its travels, thereby also bringing financial support and security for the future work of the Peace Mala educational charity. One doves in particular, number 13, is known as the Inter-Faith Dove of Peace. Information on how to sponsor the doves is available on the Peace Mala website.

Festival of Interfaith and Culture for Education
The Peace Mala Festival of Inter-Faith and Culture for Education was held at The Monastery Manchester in Gorton on 4 October 2010.  The festival was organised by Laura Daniels, Head Teacher of Woodheys Primary School in Sale Greater Manchester, one of the first accredited schools in the UK.  Daniels came on board as an educational ambassador for Peace Mala in 2008.

Recognising Achievement for Service to Wales
On 10 June 2010 the founder of Peace Mala was honoured with the Recognising Achievement for Service to Wales.  This award was first introduced by the Welsh Assembly Government in 2009. The 2010 Award for Promoting Tolerance was carefully selected to mark the 65th anniversary of the end of World War II and the liberation of the death camps in Auschwitz and elsewhere. Evans received this honour from the First Minister Carwyn Jones AM in recognition of her work with Peace Mala and her positive stand against all forms of inequality and intolerance.

Peace Mala units at Primary and Secondary level included in the new Religious Education Agreed Syllabus for Trafford Education Authority UK

On Wednesday 9 February 2011, the founder was invited to take part in a full day of meetings with Trafford Education Authority to discuss the inclusion of Peace Mala units at primary and secondary level for the new RE Agreed Syllabus.  This proved highly successful with ideas being shared between teachers and RE advisors including Steve Illingworth (Independent Educational Consultant and Education Link Officer to Salford SACRE) and Erica Pounce, School Improvement Partner and Link Advisor for Primary Education. Pounce reported that they had worked as a Collaborative with other Greater Manchester SACREs but had also developed a distinctive local flavour, which is where the Peace Mala Units would sit as an optional unit and as an example of a compelling learning experience.
The New RE syllabus for Trafford Education Authority, including units on Peace Mala, was launched on 24 March 2011.

Queen's Birthday Honours 
In the Queen's Birthday Honours for 2019, Pam Evans, founder of Peace Mala, received an MBE for services to the promotion of peace and interfaith understanding.

International Interfaith Liturgy for World Peace, Llandaff 2017
In July 2017 the Peace Mala International Interfaith Liturgy for World Peace took place at Llandaff Cathedral Wales. This major event took almost two years to organise and plan. The idea came to the founder after the Paris terrorist attacks on Friday 13 the November 2015. The founder felt urged to bring the Peace Mala community together and Llandaff Cathedral immediately sprang to mind as a venue for this. She also felt it was time to put the spotlight on the work being achieved by the children and young people in Peace Mala schools. The purpose would be to send out a message of love, friendship and peace to all people in our world. Representatives from sixteen religions, including three Christian Bishops, and supporters from across the UK and beyond attended and took part. These included dignitaries from Cardiff, Swansea, Neath Port Talbot and Greater Manchester and Peace Mala schools from across Wales, Greater Manchester and Yorkshire. The cathedral was filled to capacity and turned out to be the largest interfaith gathering for world peace that Wales had hosted.

Apostolic Blessing for Peace Mala from Pope Francis, September 2017
On 21 September 2017, Peace Mala celebrated the UN International Day of Peace at St Joseph's Catholic Cathedral in Swansea Wales UK. This was thanks to the invitation of Bishop Tom Burns of Menevia and the support of the Dean, Rev. Fr. Benedict Koledoye. Seven schools attended and took part in the Peace Mala Youth Liturgy for World Peace. Peace Mala linked up with One Day one Choir, a global peace initiative which uses the harmonious power of singing together to unite people around the world on Peace Day.

Peace Mala schools that could not be present at the event sang the Peace Mala Anthem, ‘One Light’ in their school assemblies across the UK. Lee Michael Walton, composer of the anthem, drove from London and back to accompany the children's singing on St Joseph's Cathedral organ. When it came to the final prayer and blessing from Bishop Tom, he surprised the congregation with an Apostolic Blessing from Pope Francis,

"His Holiness Pope Francis presents his good wishes to Pam Evans and to all those persons involved in Peace Mala and imparts to them the requested Apostolic Blessing upon their work for world peace and encourages them with his prayers."

Youth Liturgy for World Peace, St David's Church Neath 2018
Peace Mala worked with St David's Church in Neath to host a Youth Liturgy for World Peace on the UN International Day of Peace on 21 September 2018 . Peace Mala accredited schools and those working towards accreditation were joined by local dignitaries and 21 representatives from eleven different faiths.

International Interfaith Liturgy For World Peace, Brecon Cathedral September 2019 
On 16 September 2019, Peace Mala celebrated the UN International Day of Peace at Brecon Cathedral in South Wales. Peace Mala schools from Wales and Greater Manchester were present at the event, as were dignitaries from South Wales and Powys. Faith representatives came to Brecon from across the UK.

The event also linked up with One Day One Choir, with schoolchildren attending the event singing the Peace Mala anthem 'One Light' with West End star and supporter of Peace Mala, Steve Balsamo, and Peace Mala's Director of Music, Lee Michael Walton. Dance also played an important part in the event, with a Native American Hoop Dance being performed.

World Peace Mala Festival, St David's, Pembrokeshire, June 17th-19th 2020 
To coincide with the 900th anniversary of St David's canonisation, Peace Mala was invited by the Diocese of St David to take our interfaith World Peace Ceremony to the cathedral in 2020.

See also
CEWC-Cymru
ChildLine

Further reading
 Evans, Pam, Using the Peace Mala to Pray for World Peace (Morriston: Peace Mala Publications, 2008)
 Evans, Pam, Sharing the Light: Walking for World Peace With the Celtic Saints of Gower (Morriston: Peace Mala Publications, 2012).

External links

BBC News: Word spreads of Peace Mala
BBC News: Do you know your awareness bracelets?
Different types of meditation malas
Nature collection Malas to assist in mantra meditations

Notes

Organisations based in Swansea
Education in Swansea
Religious education
Religious pluralism
Charities based in Wales
Education in Wales